Camp Mountain is a rural locality in the Moreton Bay Region, Queensland, Australia.

Geography

The south-east of the locality is within D'Aguilar National Park and a lookout and recreation area are accessible off Mount Nebo Road.

History
There was gold mining in the area in the 1860s. The miners referred to the area as their "mountain camp" and that is the origin of the name of the mountain and the locality. In the late 1800s the mountain was known as Mount Daniel.

Camp Mountain railway station opened in 1918, and until 1955 the train line to Dayboro traversed the area. In 1947 Camp Mountain was the location of Queensland's worst railway accident.

Camp Mountain State School opened on circa 1929 and closed circa 1955. It was on Upper Camp Mountain Road (approx ).

The median age of the Camp Mountain population was 41 years, 4 years above the national median of 37.  81.7% of people living in Camp Mountain were born in Australia. The other top responses for country of birth were England 6.4%, New Zealand 1.8%, Netherlands 1%, Italy 0.9%, South Africa 0.6%.  92.1% of people spoke only English at home; the next most common languages were 1% German, 0.6% Dutch, 0.6% Cantonese, 0.6% Italian, 0.3% Hungarian.

In the  Camp Mountain had a population of 1,416 people.

Heritage listings 

Camp Mountain has a number of heritage-listed sites, including:
 20 Upper Camp Mountain Road: Selector's Hut

Education 
There are no schools is Camp Mountain. The nearest government primary schools are Samford State School in neighbouring Samford Village to the north, Patrick Road State School in neighbouring Ferny Hills to the east, and Ferny Grove State School in Ferny Grove to the east. The nearest government secondary school is Ferny Grove State High School in Ferny Grove to the east.

The Samford Ecological Research Facility is a  parcel of land bequeathed by Elizabeth Nesta Marks to the Queensland University of Technology as a teaching and research facility for biodiversity and conservation, urban development, and agriculture. It is at 148 Camp Mountain Road.

Amenities 
There are a number of parks in the locality, including:

 Mcafee Park
 Mitchell Park

 Orr Park

 Peterson Park

Attractions

Camp Mountain Lookout is at the end of Camp Mountain Road within the D'Aguilar National Park. Part of the historic Enoggera goldfields, the lookout provides views of  Moreton Bay, the Brisbane skyline and the Glass House Mountains.

References

Further reading

External links 

 

Suburbs of Moreton Bay Region
Localities in Queensland